Giovanna Rachele Mallucci (born 29 June 1963) is van Geest Professor of Clinical Neurosciences at the University of Cambridge in England and associate director of the UK Dementia Research Institute at the University of Cambridge. She is a specialist in neurodegenerative diseases.

Biography 

Giovanna Mallucci attended Haberdashers' Aske's School for Girls, Elstree before studying medicine at St Hilda's College, Oxford, and University College London, then specialized in neurology. She gained her Ph.D. in 2001 from Imperial College, London, for her work on transgenic models of prion disease, after which she combined scientific and clinical careers. In 2008, she joined the MRC Toxicology Unit as Programme Leader, focusing on generic mechanisms of neurodegeneration. In 2014, she was elected van Geest Professor of Clinical Neurosciences at the University of Cambridge and in 2017 was awarded the Cambridge Centre of UK Dementia Research Institute of which she is the director. She is an Honorary Consultant Neurologist at Addenbrooke's Hospital, with a specialist interest in dementia.

Mechanisms of neurotoxicity 

Her background is in modeling prion diseases in mice, looking at mechanisms of neurotoxicity, and developing new therapeutic approaches. Her group has shown that early synaptic changes in mice with prion disease can be reversed, resulting in the recovery of synaptic and cognitive function and behavioral deficits, long term neuroprotection, and lifelong survival of affected animals. Thus neurodegeneration can be prevented by reversing early synaptic deficits.

Their program uses several model systems – mice (wild type and transgenic), the primary neurons, and the nematode C. elegans, to understand the early molecular events that cause synaptic toxicity and neuronal cell death in neurodegeneration. In parallel, they are looking at the mechanisms involved in synaptic repair processes.

Her lab is interested in understanding mechanisms of neurodegeneration. The central theme is the identification of common pathways across the spectrum of these disorders (which include Alzheimer's and related diseases) that are relevant for both mechanistic insights and therapy. They focus both on 'toxic' processes that can be targeted to prevent neuronal death, and on regenerative processes that can be harnessed for repair. Using mouse models, they described the pathogenic role of the unfolded protein response (UPR) in neurodegeneration, which led to the discovery of the first small molecule - an inhibitor of this pathway - to prevent neurodegeneration in vivo. They also recently discovered the phenomenon of failure of synaptic repair processes in neurodegeneration and the underlying mechanisms: failure of another stress response involving 'cold shock' proteins, which they have successfully harnessed for neuroprotection. They aim to translate this research into new treatments for dementia.

Profession 
Mallucci leads the new centre of the UK Dementia Research Institute on Cambridge Biomedical Campus tasked with finding new ways to diagnose, treat, prevent and care for people with dementia.

The centre joins others at Cardiff University, the University of Edinburgh, Imperial College London and King's College London in forming the new UK Dementia Research Institute (UK DRI).

Mallucci said: “The mission of the DRI overall is to take a transformative change in the understanding of the cellular mechanisms that make brain cells go wrong in dementia and degenerative brain disease and discovering new ways of treating based on those insights. In Cambridge we have such world-leading expertise in so many different fields so we are focusing on cross-disciplinary research, integrating chemistry and biophysics along with classic cell biologists such as myself who understand the disease. It's going to be a real dementia hub. There are lots of avenues but what you need is a couple of things that are going to change the course of the disease and Cambridge is very well-positioned for those kinds of discoveries. We have real momentum on some re-purposed drugs.”

It is in this area that a team led by Mallucci has made a potentially significant breakthrough.

Having identified a major pathway that leads to brain cell death in mice, scientists have now found two drugs that block that pathway and prevent neurodegeneration, with minimal side effects in rodents.

One of these drugs – trazodone hydrochloride – is already licensed for use in humans as an antidepressant.

Mallucci said: “The exciting development is that we've bypassed the whole drug discovery pipeline, which can take forever. You don't know what's going to work in humans but it means we don't have to wait 20 years to find something.” She added: “We know that trazodone is safe to use in humans, so a clinical trial is now possible to test whether the protective effects of the drug we see on brain cells in mice with neurodegeneration also applies to people in the early stages of Alzheimer's disease and other dementias. We could know in 2-3 years whether this approach can slow down disease progression, which would be a very exciting first step in treating these disorders. “Interestingly, trazodone has been used to treat the symptoms of patients in later stages of dementia, so we know it is safe for this group. We now need to find out whether giving the drug to patients at an early stage could help arrest or slow down the disease through its effects on this pathway.” It is known that misfolded proteins build up in the brains of those with neurodegenerative diseases and are a major factor in dementias such as Alzheimer's and Parkinson's as well as prion disease. The team led by Mallucci at the Medical Research Council's (MRC) Toxicology Unit in Leicester originally discovered that this accumulation of misfolded proteins in mice with prion disease over-activated a natural defense mechanism, 'switching off' the vital production of new proteins in brain cells. Switching protein production back on with an experimental drug halted neurodegeneration but the drug tested was toxic to the pancreas and not suitable for testing in humans. But in a study published in Brain, the researchers revealed how they identified a number of suitable candidates after testing 1,040 compounds from the National Institute for Neurological Disorders and Stroke, initially in worms, which have a functioning nervous system. Testing on mice with prion disease and a form of familial tauopathy or frontotemporal dementia (FTD) identified two drugs that restored the protein production rate.

Work with MRC 

A team of MRC scientists, led by Mallucci who a few years ago identified a major pathway that leads to brain cell death in mice, have now found two drugs that block the pathway and prevent neurodegeneration. The drugs caused minimal side effects in the mice and one is already licensed for use in humans, so is ready for clinical trials.

Misfolded proteins build up in the brain in several neurodegenerative diseases and are a major factor in dementias such as Alzheimer's and Parkinson's as well as prion diseases. Previously, the team found that the accumulation of misfolded proteins in mice with prion disease over-activates a natural defense mechanism, 'switching off' the vital production of new proteins in brain cells. They then found switching protein production back on with an experimental drug halted neurodegeneration. However, the drug tested was toxic to the pancreas and not suitable for testing in humans.

In the latest study, published today in Brainopens in new window, the team tested 1040 compounds from the National Institute for Neurological Disorders and Stroke, first in worms (C.elegans) which have a functioning nervous system and are a good experimental model for screening drugs to be used on the nervous system and then in mammalian cells.  This revealed a number of suitable candidate compounds that could then be tested in mouse models of prion disease and a form of familial tauopathy (frontotemporal dementia - FTD), both of which had been protected by the experimental - but toxic - compounds in the team's previous studies.

The researchers identified two drugs that restored protein production rates in mice trazodone hydrochloride, a licensed antidepressant, and dibenzoylmethane (DBM), a compound being trialed as an anti-cancer drug. Both drugs prevented the emergence of signs of brain cell damage in most of the prion-diseased mice and restored memory in the FTD mice. In both mouse models, the drugs reduced brain shrinkage which is a feature of neurodegenerative disease.

Giovanna Mallucci, who led the team from the Medical Research Council's (MRC) Toxicology Unit in Leicester and the University of Cambridge, was today announced as one of the five associate directors of the UK Dementia Research Institute.  She said:

“We know that trazodone is safe to use in humans, so a clinical trial is now possible to test whether the protective effects of the drug we see on brain cells in mice with neurodegeneration also applies to people in the early stages of Alzheimer's disease and other dementias. We could know in 2-3 years whether this approach can slow down disease progression, which would be a very exciting first step in treating these disorders.

“Interestingly, Trazodone has been used to treat the symptoms of patients in later stages of dementia, so we know it is safe for this group.  We now need to find out whether giving the drug to patients at an early stage could help arrest or slow down the disease through its effects on this pathway.”

The research was funded by the Medical Research Council and Mallucci was also funded by a grant from Alzheimer's Society and Alzheimer's Drug Discovery Foundation.

Rob Buckle, Chief Science Officer at the MRC, said: “This study builds on previous work by this team and is a great example of how really innovative discovery science can quite quickly translate into the possibility of real drugs to treat disease.

“The two drugs identified remain experimental but they were shown to protect the mice even when given after the processes underlying neurodegeneration had become established.  We currently have no way of treating these diseases so the prospect of finding drugs that can slow or stop them from progressing is extremely exciting – even more so when this is based on drugs that have already undergone expensive and time-consuming testing in unrelated studies to establish that they are likely to be safe to use in humans.”

Dr. Doug Brown, Director of Research and Development at the Alzheimer's Society, said:

“We're excited by the potential of these findings. They show that a treatment approach originally discovered in mice with prion disease might also work to prevent the death of brain cells in some forms of dementia. This research is at a very early stage and has not yet been tested in people - but as one of the drugs is already available as a treatment for depression, the time taken to get from the lab to the pharmacy could be dramatically reduced.

“The drug blocks a natural defense mechanism in cells which is overactive in the brains of people with frontotemporal dementia, Alzheimer's disease and Parkinson's, so has the potential to work for several conditions. So far it has only been tested in mice with frontotemporal dementia but Alzheimer's Society is now funding the researchers to test it in models of Alzheimer's too.”

References

External links 

1963 births
Living people
People educated at Haberdashers' Girls' School
Alumni of St Hilda's College, Oxford
Alumni of University College London
Alumni of Imperial College London
Academics of the University of Leicester
Women medical researchers
British medical researchers
British neuroscientists
British women neuroscientists
Fellows of Churchill College, Cambridge
Fellows of the Royal College of Physicians